Myrthe Moorrees (born 12 December 1994) is a Dutch football midfielder who plays for 1. FC Köln in the Frauen-Bundesliga. She previously played for VVV-Venlo, FC Utrecht and PSV Eindhoven.

On 19 October 2017 she made her debut for the Netherlands women's national football team against Austria.

Honours
PSV
Runner-up
 KNVB Women's Cup: 2013–14

VVV
Runner-up
 KNVB Women's Cup: 2011–12

References

External links
 

1994 births
Living people
People from Venray
Dutch women's footballers
Netherlands women's international footballers
Eredivisie (women) players
VVV-Venlo (women) players
FC Utrecht (women) players
PSV (women) players
FC Twente (women) players
Women's association football midfielders
SC Sand players
Frauen-Bundesliga players
Dutch expatriate women's footballers
Dutch expatriate sportspeople in Germany
1. FC Köln (women) players
Expatriate women's footballers in Germany
Footballers from Limburg (Netherlands)